No. 525 Squadron was a Royal Air Force transport aircraft squadron that operated during the Second World War.

History
The squadron was formed on 1 September 1943 at RAF Weston Zoyland to operate the Vickers Warwick in the transport role.  It first operated on the routes from England to Gibraltar and North Africa, but the Warwick was not the best aircraft for the role and it was withdrawn in 1944. The Warwick was replaced with the Douglas Dakota and one example of the Mark III transport version of the former four-engined heavy bomber, the Short Stirling.  The squadron soon operated on routes throughout Europe and also became mainly manned by Canadian personnel.
By the end of the war it was mainly operating routes to India. The Canadians withdrew at the end of the war, but the squadron continued with trooping flights.  On 1 December 1946 the squadron was disbanded at RAF Abingdon, when it was re-numbered to 238 Squadron.

Aircraft operated

Squadron airfields

Commanding officers

See also
List of Royal Air Force aircraft squadrons

References
Notes

Bibliography

External links

 No. 525 Squadron history at old MOD site
 No. 525 Squadron history at new MOD site
 Squadron histories for nos. 521–540 squadron at RafWeb's Air of Authority – A History of RAF Organisation

Aircraft squadrons of the Royal Air Force in World War II
525
Military units and formations established in 1943
Transport units and formations of the Royal Air Force